The 2020 Copa CONMEBOL Sudamericana was the 19th edition of the CONMEBOL Sudamericana (also referred to as the Copa Sudamericana, or ), South America's secondary club football tournament organized by CONMEBOL.

On 17 October 2019, CONMEBOL announced that the final would be played at the Estadio Mario Alberto Kempes in Córdoba, Argentina with the final originally scheduled to be played on 7 November 2020. Argentine club Defensa y Justicia defeated fellow Argentine club Lanús by a 3–0 score in the final to win their first tournament title. As champions, Defensa y Justicia earned the right to play against the winners of the 2020 Copa Libertadores in the 2021 Recopa Sudamericana. They also automatically qualified for the 2021 Copa Libertadores group stage. Independiente del Valle were the defending champions, but did not play this edition as they qualified for the 2020 Copa Libertadores group stage as Copa Sudamericana champions and later advanced to the knockout stage.

On 21 May 2019, CONMEBOL announced that clubs must pass certain eligibility requirements in order to compete in the 2020 Copa Libertadores and Copa Sudamericana. One of the original requirements was that teams must be in the top division of their member association, but this was removed after many associations stated that they had not adapted the regulations of their qualifying competitions for the 2020 Copa Libertadores and Copa Sudamericana.

The tournament was suspended after its first round due to the COVID-19 pandemic and resumed on 27 October 2020. It ended with the final on 23 January 2021.

Teams
The following 44 teams from the 10 CONMEBOL associations qualified for the tournament, entering the first stage:
Argentina and Brazil: 6 berths each
All other associations: 4 berths each

A further 10 teams eliminated from the 2020 Copa Libertadores will be transferred to the Copa Sudamericana, entering the second stage.

Schedule
The schedule of the competition is as follows.

On 17 April 2020, CONMEBOL announced that the tournament would be suspended indefinitely due to the COVID-19 pandemic, and no date had been set for its resumption. On 10 July 2020, CONMEBOL announced the new schedule for the remainder of the competition.

Draws

First stage

Second stage

Final stages

Seeding

Bracket

Round of 16

Quarter-finals

Semi-finals

Final

Statistics

Top scorers

See also
2020 Copa Libertadores
2021 Recopa Sudamericana

Notes

References

External links
CONMEBOL Sudamericana 2020, CONMEBOL.com

 
2020
2
Association football events postponed due to the COVID-19 pandemic